Events from the year 1732 in art.

Events
 Nicola Salvi begins work on the new Trevi Fountain

Works

 Canaletto
 View of the Entrance to the Venetian Arsenal
 Return of the Bucentoro to the Molo on Ascension Day
 Jean-Baptiste-Siméon Chardin – Lady Sealing a Letter
 Filippo della Valle – Cupid and Psyche (marble; approximate date)
 William Hogarth – A Midnight Modern Conversation; A Harlot's Progress (engravings by the artist)

Births
 January 25 – François Devosge, French portrait painter (died 1811)
 February 22 – Jean-Bernard Restout, French painter (died 1797)
 April 5 – Jean-Honoré Fragonard, French painter and printmaker (died 1806)
 May 27 – Christopher Unterberger, Italian painter of the early-Neoclassical period (died 1798)
 November 18 – Pehr Hilleström, Swedish painter and teacher (died 1816)
 date unknown
 Christian Gottlob Fechhelm, German portrait and historical painter (died 1816)
 Johanne Seizberg, German-Danish illustrator and teacher (died 1772)
 probable
 John Julius Angerstein, Russian-born British art collector (died 1823)
 Carl-Ludwig Christinek, Russian painter (died 1794)

Deaths
 February 18 – Balthasar Permoser, Austrian sculptor (born 1651)
 February 28 – André Charles Boulle, cabinet maker (born 1642)
 August 23 – Felice Boselli, Italian painter (born 1650)
 September 22 – Herman Moll, engraver (born c. 1654)
 October 25 – Andrea Brustolon, Italian sculptor in wood (born 1662)
 date unknown
 Francesco Bassi, Italian painter (born 1642)
 Jacques-Philippe Ferrand, French miniaturist and painter in enamel (born 1653)
 Antonio Gionima, Italian painter (born 1697)
 Abdulcelil Levni, Turkish/Italian poet and painter, in the service of the court at Istanbul (born 1680)
 Gasparo Lopez, Italian painter of flowers (born 1677)
 Michele Pagano, Italian painter of landscapes or vedutista (born 1697)
 Matthijs Pool, Dutch engraver (born 1676)
 Giovanni Battista Revello, Italian painter of landscape elements for other historical painters (born 1672)
 Jiang Tingxi, Chinese painter (born 1669)
 Giuseppe Tonelli, Italian painter of frescoes and quadratura (born 1668)
 Jan Joost van Cossiau, Flemish landscape painter and engraver (born 1660)
 Richard Waitt, Scottish portrait painter

References

 
Years of the 18th century in art
1730s in art